is a Japanese footballer currently playing as a forward for FC Gifu. He is the younger brother of fellow professional footballer Boniface Nduka.

Career statistics

Club
.

Notes

References

1998 births
Living people
Association football people from Saitama Prefecture
Josai University alumni
Japanese footballers
Nigerian footballers
Japanese people of Nigerian descent
Sportspeople of Nigerian descent
Association football forwards
J3 League players
YSCC Yokohama players
FC Gifu players